Viorel Costraş (born 19 June 1959) is a Romanian water polo player. He competed in the men's tournament at the 1980 Summer Olympics.

References

1959 births
Living people
Romanian male water polo players
Olympic water polo players of Romania
Water polo players at the 1980 Summer Olympics
Sportspeople from Oradea